HiJaak is an image manager, graphics converter and screen capture computer program from IMSI/Design.  It can also be used for batch editing.

History

HiJaak began as a DOS-based screen capture and graphics file format converter program for the IBM Personal Computer from Inset Systems, Inc. of Brookfield, Connecticut. At the time of the release of version 2.0 in December 1990, the program was capable of converting between more than 36 different graphics file formats. HiJaak was converted from 16-bit DOS to run on 32-bit Microsoft Windows 95 in 1995.  The current successor, HiJaak Pro version 5, can handle more than 115 raster and vector graphics file formats.  Graphics screen capture is not a native capability of DOS-based systems, hence there was a need for third-party programs such as HiJaak.  With current graphical user interfaces such as Microsoft Windows, screen capture is a built-in feature, but this is usually limited to capturing the entire screen, or at least the contents of one window on the screen.  HiJaak allows the user to capture small selections on the screen.

Inset Systems was acquired by Quarterdeck Corporation in exchange for 993,000 shares of Quarterdeck common stock in September 1995.  In 1998, after the market for DOS utilities collapsed, Quarterdeck was acquired by Symantec.  At some time between 1998 and 2000, Symantec sold HiJaak to International Microcomputer Software, Inc. (IMSI), of Novato, California, who then incorporated it into their business products line.

IMSI/Design, LLC, the current owner of HiJaak, also produces TurboCAD.

References

External links
 www.imsidesign.com — IMSI/Design, LLC site

Graphics software